Scoparia sylvestris is a species of moth of the family Crambidae. It is endemic in New Zealand.

Taxonomy

This species was described by Charles E. Clarke in 1926. However the placement of this species within the genus Scoparia is in doubt. As a result, this species has also been referred to as Scoparia (s.l.) sylvestris.

Description

The wingspan is about 18 mm. The forewings are dark green, irrorated with white. The hindwings are dark fuscous, but more dark outwardly. Adults have been recorded on wing in January.

References

Moths described in 1926
Moths of New Zealand
Scorparia
Endemic fauna of New Zealand
Endemic moths of New Zealand